Kelsey Creek, California may refer to:

 Kelsey Creek (Lake County), a tributary of Clear Lake in Lake County, California
 Kelseyville, California, a town formerly called Kelsey Creek, just south of Clear Lake in Lake County, California